Sobolice may refer to the following places:
Sobolice, Nowa Sól County in Lubusz Voivodeship (west Poland)
Sobolice, Zielona Góra County in Lubusz Voivodeship (west Poland)
Sobolice, Żary County in Lubusz Voivodeship (west Poland)